Sir Robert Fraser (1904–1985) was an Australian who, in the United Kingdom,  worked as a journalist, civil servant and  as the first Director General of the British Independent Television Authority (ITA).

Biography 
Born in Adelaide, Australia, Fraser graduated BA from the University of Melbourne, where he was resident at Trinity College from 1924 to 1926. Whilst in college, he was elected Secretary of the Trinity College Dialectic Society, and won numerous prizes, including the Wigram Allen Essay Prize (1924), the Leeper Debating Prize (1924 and 1925), and the President's Medal for Oratory (1925). He left with his parents, Mr and Mrs Reginald Fraser of Mt Lofty, South Australia, for the United Kingdom in 1927 for further study at the London School of Economics.

He worked as a writer for the Daily Herald newspaper before unsuccessfully attempting to get elected to Parliament in 1935, standing for the Labour Party in York. During the Second World War, Fraser joined the Ministry of Information where he became Head of Publications, launching a successful series of informative booklets about the war effort, and eventually Director-General of the Central Office of Information. For his war-time service, he was appointed OBE in 1944 and knighted in 1949.

However, Fraser is probably best known for his contribution to the ITV system through his work with the Independent Television Authority. He took the post of Director General at the ITA's inauguration in 1954, having been encouraged to do so by his friend Norman Collins and the ITA Chairman Kenneth Clark. Fraser continued in the post until 1970, supervising most of the initial construction and development of ITV.

References

 Sendall, Bernard Independent Television in Britain: Volume 1 - Origin and Foundation 1946-62 London: The Macmillan Press Ltd 1982 (reprinted 1984) 

1904 births
1985 deaths
People educated at Trinity College (University of Melbourne)
ITV people
Alumni of the London School of Economics
Labour Party (UK) parliamentary candidates